Mitsutaka (written: 光隆, 光高 or 光孝) is a masculine Japanese given name. Notable people with the name include:

 (1959–1998), Japanese physicist
 (1630–1666), Japanese daimyō
Mitsutaka Kusakabe (born 1968), Japanese golfer
 (1616–1645), Japanese daimyō
Mitsutaka Tachikawa (born 1949), Japanese voice actor 

Japanese masculine given names